Helenio Herrera Gavilán (10 April 1910  – 9 November 1997) was an Argentine, naturalized French, football player and manager. He is best remembered for his success with the Inter Milan team known as Grande Inter in the 1960s.

During his managerial career, Herrera won four La Liga titles in Spain (with Atlético Madrid and Barcelona) and three Serie A titles in Italy with Inter. He also guided Inter to European glory, winning two consecutive European Cups, among several other honours. He is regarded as one of the greatest managers of all time.

Herrera was arguably the first manager to collect credit for his teams' performances, in the process becoming a superstar in the world of football. Up to that time, managers were more marginal figures in a team. All teams throughout Europe were known for their headline-grabbing individual players, e.g. Di Stéfano's Real Madrid, whereas Inter during the 1960s is still referred to as Herrera's Inter.

Early life and playing career
Herrera was born in Buenos Aires, Argentina, to Spanish parents. His father Francisco, who worked as a carpenter, was an exiled anarchist from Andalusia. His mother, Maria Gavilán Martínez, was a cleaner. In 1920, Herrera’s family left Argentina for Casablanca, Morocco, then a French colonial city, in search of a better life. In Casablanca Herrera started his career as a footballer.

Playing as a central defender, in 1932 he earned a transfer from RC Casablanca to mainland France – CASG Paris. Before World War II, Herrera (or H.H. as he was known) played in Stade Français, FCO Charleville (where he was called up for the national team twice) and Excelsior Roubaix. During the war, he played for five years more in Red Star Paris, Stade Français, EF Paris-Capitale and Puteaux, where he started his managing career in 1944 as a player-manager. He retired in 1945, and while his playing career was very short of notable successes, his managing career, coinciding with the early beginnings of UEFA competitions, had a marked effect on the game's tactical definitions.

Managing career
After his first season in Puteaux, Herrera rejoined Stade Français for a third time now as manager. After three seasons with no trophies collected, the club's president opted to sell the club. Herrera moved to Spain, where he spent the next six years with Real Valladolid, Atlético Madrid (where he won La Liga in 1950 and 1951), CD Málaga, Deportivo de La Coruña and Sevilla, before moving to Portugal and entering a two-year tenure with Lisbon side Os Belenenses. Later returning to Spain, he managed giants Barcelona, where he won various titles (including La Liga, twice), but several problems, including disagreements between him and star player Ladislao Kubala, forced him to leave the club in 1960.

He immediately emigrated to Italy and signed with Inter Milan (where he was to remain until 1968), winning three Serie A titles and two European Cups during his stay with the club, where he used a 5–3–2 formation, and modified a tactic known as the Verrou (door bolt) – used by Karl Rappan – to include larger flexibility for counter-attacks; thus, the Catenaccio system was born. The side was later nicknamed Grande Inter, due to the club's successes under Herrera's eight–year spell, which saw the team win back–to–back European Cup titles in 1964 and 1965, as well as three Serie A titles, and two Intercontinental Cup titles. During this time he was also coaching Spain (between 1959 and 1962) and Italy (1966–67).

In 1968, Herrera moved to Roma, where he became the highest paid manager in the world, with a contract worth an estimated £150,000 per year. He won the Coppa Italia in his first season but relations with club president Alvaro Marchini had already soured over the tragic death of his centre-forward Giuliano Taccola in the team dressing room at an away game against Cagliari. The following season, 1969–70, erratic results in the League gave Marchini the excuse to sack him.

He returned to management for a one-year stint with Inter for the 1973–74 season. Herrera then suffered a heart attack, did not want to coach full-time any more and retired in Venice where he lived the rest of his life. While inactive between 1974 and 1978, Herrera returned briefly during the end of the decade, managing Rimini Calcio and finally ending his career with a return to FC Barcelona for one-and-a-half seasons in 1980 and 1981.

Influence

He pioneered the use of psychological motivating skills – his pep-talk phrases are still quoted today, e.g. "he who doesn't give it all, gives nothing", "with 10 our team plays better than with 11" (after his team had to face the second half of a game with only 10 players on the field) and "Class + Preparation + Intelligence + Athleticism = Championships". These slogans were often plastered on billboards around the ground and chanted by players during training sessions.

He also enforced a strict discipline code, for the first time forbidding players to drink or smoke and controlling their diet – once at Inter he suspended a player after telling the press "we came to play in Rome" instead of "we came to win in Rome". He also sent club personnel to players' homes during the week to perform '"bed-checks." He introduced the ritiro, a pre-match remote country hotel retreat that started with the collection of players on Thursday to prepare for a Sunday game.

He was also one of the first managers to call on the support of the "12th player" – the spectators. While indirectly, this led to the appearance of the first Ultras movements in the late 60s. While defensive in nature, his understanding of the Catenaccio was slightly different from that practised by other Italian teams and the original Verrou, as he often used the full backs (particularly Giacinto Facchetti) as half backs (defensively supported by the libero) to launch faster counter-attacks, a staple of Italian tactics – yet, he never denied the heart of his team relied on defence.

In 2004 Herrera's widow Fiora Gandolfi (his third wife) released a book called Tacalabala. In it was collected sayings, sketches and notes from Herrera's notebooks and journals.

Tactics
Herrera's standard formation at Inter was the 5–3–2 system, which almost always included a sweeper (usually the team's captain, Armando Picchi), as well as four man-marking defenders. He was openly dismissive of teams that had an obsession for dominating ball possession, declaring that "the ball always moves further, and more quickly, when there isn’t a player behind it".

Although Herrera's Barcelona side was known for playing a fluid, attacking brand of football, his pragmatic catenaccio tactics at Inter were often criticised for producing few goals, and for being dull, overly defensive, or even destructive; Herrera and several of Inter's players at the time refuted these claims, however, with Herrera later stating: "The problem is that most of the ones who copied me copied me wrongly. They forgot to include the attacking principles that my Catenaccio included. I had Picchi as a sweeper, yes, but I also had Facchetti, the first full-back to score as many goals as a forward".

Aside from the team's defensive strength and organisation when defending behind the ball, some of the key elements of Herrera's Grande Inter side of the 1960s were the use of vertical football and very quick, efficient counter-attacks, which allowed the team to score with few touches. This was made possible due to Herrera's use of very quick and energetic, attacking full-backs, such as Giacinto Facchetti, and Tarcisio Burgnich, who would often detach themselves from the back-line and catch their opponents by surprise with their overlapping runs. Furthermore, the team's main creative force, Spanish deep-lying playmaker Luis Suárez, played a fundamental part in Inter's success during this period, due to his outstanding work-rate, technical skills, vision and passing range; these attributes enabled him to aid the team to win back possession, and subsequently launch quick attacks with accurate long balls out to the on-running full-backs, who would often go on either to score or assist the strikers.

After successive European Cups in 1964 and 1965, Helenio Herrera's Catenaccio style of play suffered a massive blow in the 1967 final in Lisbon, when they came up against Scottish champions Celtic of Glasgow, – nicknamed the Lisbon Lions – who consisted of a group of players who were all born within 30 miles of Celtic's home ground, Celtic Park. Celtic won the game 2–1 after coming back from a 7th-minute Mazzola penalty, with many pundits claiming this was a 'victory for football' against the defensively-destructive Catenaccio.

Trivia

Helenio Herrera was nicknamed il Mago (the Wizard) and H.H. (from the initials of his name) by Italian sports journalists (who recognised him as one of the finest coaches in Italian football history) due to his success and tactical prowess, and because on occasion he would provocatively announce the results of Sunday's games and often his prediction turned out to be correct.

Honours

Manager
Atlético Madrid
La Liga: 1949–50, 1950–51
Copa Eva Duarte: 1950

Barcelona
La Liga: 1958–59, 1959–60
Copa del Rey: 1958–59, 1980–81
Inter-Cities Fairs Cup: 1955–58, 1958–60

Inter Milan
Serie A: 1962–63, 1964–65, 1965–66
European Cup: 1963–64, 1964–65
Intercontinental Cup: 1964, 1965

Roma
Coppa Italia: 1968–69

Individual
Italian Football Hall of Fame: 2015
Greatest Manager of All Time – one of 5 managers ranked top 10 by France Football, World Soccer and ESPN
4th place (World Soccer): 2013
5th place (ESPN): 2013
7th place (France Football): 2019

References

External links

 
La Liga manager stats
 
 Helenio Herrera: FIFA Profile

1910 births
1997 deaths
Argentine people of Spanish descent
Footballers from Buenos Aires
Footballers from Casablanca
Argentine footballers
Association football defenders
Racing de Casablanca players
Stade Français (association football) players
OFC Charleville players
Excelsior AC (France) players
Red Star F.C. players
Ligue 1 players
Ligue 2 players
Argentine expatriate footballers
Argentine expatriate sportspeople in France
Argentine expatriate sportspeople in Morocco
Expatriate footballers in France
Expatriate footballers in Morocco
Argentine emigrants to France
Naturalized citizens of France
Argentine football managers
Real Valladolid managers
Atlético Madrid managers
CD Málaga managers
Deportivo de La Coruña managers
Sevilla FC managers
C.F. Os Belenenses managers
FC Barcelona managers
Spain national football team managers
Inter Milan managers
Italy national football team managers
A.S. Roma managers
Rimini F.C. 1912 managers
La Liga managers
Primeira Liga managers
Serie A managers
Serie B managers
UEFA Champions League winning managers
1962 FIFA World Cup managers
Argentine expatriate football managers
Argentine expatriate sportspeople in Spain
Argentine expatriate sportspeople in Portugal
Argentine expatriate sportspeople in Italy
Expatriate football managers in France
Expatriate football managers in Spain
Expatriate football managers in Portugal
Expatriate football managers in Italy